Henry Talbot may refer to:

 Henry Talbot (cricketer) (1863–1911), English cricketer
 Henry Talbot (landowner), Irish landowner of the 17th century
 Henry Talbot (photographer) (1920–1999), German-Australian fashion photographer
 Henry Talbot (rugby union), Argentine rugby player
 Henry Fox Talbot (1800–1877), British scientist, inventor and photography pioneer
 Henry Paul Talbot (1864–1927), American chemist